Morus cathayana or hua sang is a deciduous tree in the mulberry family which is native to China, Japan and Korea.

Description
Morus cathayana is a deciduous tree usually found in secondary forest and scrubland. The tree reaches a height of up to 15 metres (49 feet) and flowers from May to June. It produces edible berries and its leaves are made into a tea.

References

Flora of China
Trees of China
Trees of Korea
Crops originating from China
cathayana